TRV734 is a drug developed by Trevena Inc which acts as a biased agonist at the μ-opioid receptor, selective for activation of the G-protein signalling pathway over β-arrestin 2 recruitment. It is closely related to oliceridine and has a similar pharmacological profile, but unlike oliceridine which has to be injected, TRV734 is suitable to be administered orally.

See also 
 PZM21
 SHR9352
 SR-17018

References 

Mu-opioid receptor agonists
Pyridines
Fluoroarenes
Spiro compounds
Oxygen heterocycles
Amines